Emanuel Löffler (29 December 1901 in Meziříčko – 5 August 1986 in Prague) was a Czech gymnast who competed in the 1928 Summer Olympics and in the 1936 Summer Olympics.

References

1901 births
1986 deaths
People from Letovice
People from the Margraviate of Moravia
Czechoslovak male artistic gymnasts
Olympic gymnasts of Czechoslovakia
Gymnasts at the 1928 Summer Olympics
Gymnasts at the 1936 Summer Olympics
Olympic silver medalists for Czechoslovakia
Olympic bronze medalists for Czechoslovakia
Olympic medalists in gymnastics
Medalists at the 1928 Summer Olympics
Sportspeople from the South Moravian Region